Cymopterus basalticus is a species of flowering plant in the carrot family known by the common name Intermountain wavewing. It is native only to parts of Utah and White Pine County, Nevada in the United States. C. basalticus grows on bare basaltic and clay soils typically in pinyon-juniper woodland and sagebrush communities.

References

basalticus
Flora of Nevada
Flora of Utah
Endemic flora of the United States
Endangered flora of the United States